Justice Robinson may refer to:

Beth Robinson (born 1965), associate justice of the Vermont Supreme Court
Gifford S. Robinson (1843–1936), associate justice of the Iowa Supreme Court
Ira E. Robinson (1869–1951), associate justice of the Supreme Court of Appeals of West Virginia
James E. Robinson (1868–1932), associate justice of the Ohio Supreme Court
James Robinson (North Dakota judge) (1843–1933), associate justice of the North Dakota Supreme Court
John McCracken Robinson (1794–1843), associate justice of the Illinois Supreme Court
John Mitchell Robinson (1827–1896), chief justice of the Maryland Court of Appeals
John Robinson (judge) (1880–1951), chief justice of the Washington Supreme Court
Jonathan Robinson (American politician) (1756–1819), chief justice of the Vermont Supreme Court
Richard A. Robinson (born 1957), associate justice of the Connecticut Supreme Court
Silas A. Robinson (1840–1927), associate justice of the Connecticut Supreme Court
Sam Robinson (Arkansas judge), associate justice of the Arkansas Supreme Court
Sylvester Robinson, associate justice of the Rhode Island Supreme Court
Waltour Moss Robinson, associate justice of the Supreme Court of Missouri
William P. Robinson III (born 1940), associate justice of the Rhode Island Supreme Court

See also
Judge Robinson (disambiguation)